Rueso is a district (amphoe) of Narathiwat province, southern Thailand.

Geography
Neighboring districts are (from the northeast clockwise): Bacho, Yi-ngo, Ra-ngae and Si Sakhon of Narathiwat Province; Bannang Sata and Raman of Yala province.

History
Originally the area of the district was tambon Tamma-ngan (ตำมะหงัน) of Mueang Ra-ngae District, the present-day Ra-ngae district. In 1913 it was upgraded to Tamma-ngan Minor District (king amphoe), consisting of six sub-districts (tambons). In 1917 it was renamed "Rueso". On 1 October 1939 the minor district was upgraded to a full district.

Administration
The district is subdivided into nine sub-districts (tambons), which are further subdivided into 71 villages (mubans). The township (thesaban tambon) Rueso covers parts of tambons Rueso and Rueso Ok. There are a further nine tambon administrative organizations (TAO).

References

External links
amphoe.com

Districts of Narathiwat province